Pliskovica is a village in the Municipality of Sežana in the Littoral region of Slovenia close to the border with Italy.

The parish church in the settlement is dedicated to Saint Thomas and belongs to the Diocese of Koper.

References

External links

Pliskovica on Geopedia

Populated places in the Municipality of Sežana